Jeremoabo is a municipality in the state of Bahia in the North-East region of Brazil.

The municipality contains part of the Raso da Catarina ecoregion.
The municipality contains the  Cocorobó Area of Relevant Ecological Interest, created in 1984.
The municipality contains part of the  Raso da Catarina Ecological Station, created in 2001.
To the south of the ecological station it contains the  Serra Branca / Raso da Catarina Environmental Protection Area, also created in 2001.

Notable people
Jemerson (footballer)

See also

List of municipalities in Bahia

References

Municipalities in Bahia